Temba Tagwireyi (born 16 January 1982), known professionally as Tembalami, is a Zimbabwean gospel artist and businessman.

Background
Tagwireyi was born in Chitungwiza where he grew up and attended his early education.

Tagwireyi started his music career in 2002 as part of a gospel group called The Burning Bush, then he had a stint as a secular artist in 2004. During that time, he collaborated with the rap duo Extra Large. He became prominent after the release of the Tomurumbidza single which became a hit on radio charts in Zimbabwe in 2011. Tagwireyi had his first studio recording with The Burning Bush. He then left the group to become one of the founding members of popular group, Zimpraise Choir, in 2006. He had his first international tour in 2014 when he toured the United States' East Coast.

Personal life
Tagwireyi is married to Anesu Mawoneke since November 2018.

Discography

Albums
Bighter Day 2011
Faith-Aid Kit 2013
Ministry of works (Audio and DVD album) 2015
The Fight 2018

Singles
Tomurumbidza feat. Wellington Kwenda 2011
Mhanya 2013
Handidzokere shure 2013
Bayete 2014
Hande 2014
L.O.V.E 2015
Sekerera 2017
Mirira 2018
Dairai 2018
Mbiri x Janet Manyowa 2020

Awards

References

Zimbabwean musicians
1982 births
Living people